Sukumar Bose (12 May 1912 – 10 November 1986) was an Indian artist based in Delhi who was trained in the tradition of the Bengal School under Asit Kumar Haldar.

Early life
Sukumar Bose was born on 12 May 1912 in Lucknow, Uttar Pradesh, India, to Sanat Kumar Bose and Bina Pani Bose. Bipin Behari Bose, Bose's paternal grandfather, was a successful lawyer of the Lucknow Bar. The Boses, with affiliations to the Brahmo Samaj movement, were an influential upper-middle class Bengali family in Lucknow where they were actively involved in promoting Bengal art and culture. In 1936, Sukumar Bose married Bela Chaudhury.

Asit Kumar Haldar became a good friend of the family's after he arrived in Lucknow to head the Government Art College. Asit Kumar Haldar was closely related to the writer and poet Rabindranath Tagore (Haldar was Tagore's elder sister's grandson). Haldar was educated in Shantiniketan under the direct guidance of Rabindranath Tagore.

When Bose's interests turned towards fine arts he was enrolled to the Government Art College and studied art under the personal supervision of Haldar.

Career

In 1932 aged 20, Sukumar Bose was appointed art teacher at the Modern School Delhi. Bose taught at the school until 1947. Bose, along with his predecessors including Sarada Ukil, has been credited for introducing the Bengal School art tradition and style to North India.

Throughout his artistic career, Bose was actively involved in the promotion of Indian art and culture. He was a pioneer member of the All India Fine Arts and Crafts Society (AIFACS), the precursor to what is today's state-run Lalit Kala Academy. As an active member of the AIFACS, he was involved in the publication of Roopa Lekha, a bi-annual art journal.

Bose's society memberships included the following:

 The Governing Council, All India Fine Arts & Crafts Society
 Army Headquarters Dramatic Society, New Delhi
 Board of Technical Education, Delhi

In 1950, Bose was commissioned by the Venerable Pope Pius XII, head of the Roman Catholic Church at the time, to produce a piece in the Indian style on a Christian subject. This piece, "The Nativity – The Birth of Christ" is housed at The Vatican.

Between 1952 and 1960, Bose conducted numerous solo exhibitions in countries including the United Kingdom, the United States of America, Australia and the former USSR, as well as in cities across India.

When he retired in 1972, Bose was appointed honorary art advisor to the then President Shri V.V. Giri.  Bose held this position until 1974.

Work

Sukumar Bose's style can be described as Indo-Persian. He used largely solid colours such as black, red, gold and silver, but in softer tones. Bose painted several murals and frescoes. Some of his most striking wall paintings are in Rashtrapati Bhavan.

Bose also ventured into modern art by blending old and new techniques. However, Bose always adhered to classical principles of realism. As a result of his art education, Bose was more of a traditionalist, preferring realism over the more abstract styles of interpretation. Described by The Bombay Chronicle as a "versatile artist", Bose was a firm believer in the learning of technique. To him, anyone who argued otherwise was merely incapable of withstanding "a steady and strenuous physical and intellectual hardship.

Awards
1970 Padma Shri Award

References

External links
 The Christian Task in Independent India. Aiyadurai Jesudasen Appasamy, SPCK 1951 (ISBN unavailable), page149: "I asked this young man what were his ideals for the service of the country, and he said to me, "You know the writings of Jawaharlal Nehru. His ideals are our ideals and we seek to emulate his spirit. In the realm of art, Sukumar Bose".
 A Dream Turns Seventy-five. Kaushwant Singh & Syeda S. Hameed, Allied Publishers Limited, . "Time's Winged Chariot", page 65: "The Hall of Religions is inaugurated by Guradev Rabindranath Tagore. The fresco on the wall depicts men and women of all religions and nationalities going towards the "Light of Truth". The artist is Sukumar Bose of the school of art department. Books of all religions are placed there for students to browse through. It is a meditation room."
 A Dream Turns Seventy-five. Kaushwant Singh & Syeda Saiyidain Hameed, Allied Publishers Limited, . "The Enchanted Studio" by Geeta Kapur, page 113: "Then came Sukumar Bose, a protege of Asit Kumar Halder and Biswanath Mukerjee of the same lineage. Here was the Bengal School as well as Santiniketan imported to this Delhi high school in full measure. This was a legacy that spelled a national style in art; it had gradually become, in fact, the official Indian style propagated in every major institution".
 Lalit Kala Contemporary. Lalit Kala Academy, 1972
 Roopa Lekha. All Indian Fine Arts & Crafts Society, 1979
 The Times of India Directory and Year Book including Who's Who, 1974
 Hindusthan Standard, 28 February 1952: "Paintings by S.Bose; Exhibition sponsored by Army HQ Drama Society"
 The Statesman, 26 September 1931: "Art Exhibition at Naini Tal - Posters praised; charming presentation of Indian life"
 The Times of India, 28 February 1952: "Sukumar Bose's One-Man Show, Inauguration by General Cariappa"
 The Age (Melbourne, Australia), 25 November 1952: "Indian Art"
 SukumarBose.org

Indian male painters
Recipients of the Padma Shri in arts
Artists from Lucknow
1912 births
1986 deaths
Indian curators
20th-century Indian painters
Painters from Uttar Pradesh
20th-century Indian male artists